Salem Academy Christian Schools is a private Christian school in Salem, Oregon, United States.

The school has been accredited by the Association of Christian Schools International since 2003, and by the Northwest Association of Accredited Schools since 1959.

References

Notable alumni
Grayson Boucher, Street Basketball Player "The Professor" And1 Mix Tape Tour

Dani Hoots, author of young adult, science fiction, fantasy, and LGBTQ novels

High schools in Salem, Oregon
Private middle schools in Oregon
Christian schools in Oregon
Private elementary schools in Oregon
Private high schools in Oregon
1945 establishments in Oregon